Helong people are one of the indigenous inhabitants of Timor Island, in Indonesia. Most of them live in Kupang Regency, namely in West Kupang and Central Kupang; and some also settled in Flores Island and Semau Island. Their livelihoods are mainly farming, hunting, fishing, and making traditional crafts.

They speak a native language called Helong, which has two dialects, the Helong Semau dialect and the Eastern Land Helong dialect. Helong speakers are found in four villages on the South-Western coast of West Timor, as well as on Semau Island, a small island just off the coast of West Timor.

The smallest Helong family system is a nuclear family, which then joins into a limited larger family (ngalo). Some ngalo joins to form a clan (ingu) which is led by a clan leader (koka ana). In terms of social strata, the ancient Helong community was divided into three layers, the nobility (usif), ordinary people (tob), and slaves (ata).

Notable people 

 Viktor Laiskodat

See also 
 Helong language
 Timor Island
 Kupang

References 

Ethnic groups in Indonesia
East Nusa Tenggara